Bromine can form several different unstable oxides:

 Dibromine monoxide (Br2O)

 Bromine dioxide (BrO2)

 Dibromine trioxide (Br2O3)

 Dibromine pentoxide (Br2O5)

 Tribromine octoxide (Br3O8)

Also, a number of ions are bromine oxides:

 Hypobromite (BrO−)

 Bromite (BrO2−)

 Bromate (BrO3−)

 Perbromate (BrO4−)

And the bromine monoxide radical:

 Bromine oxide (BrO)

See also
 Oxygen fluoride
 Chlorine oxide
 Iodine oxide

Bromine compounds
Oxides